Cary Academy is an independent, coeducational, nonsectarian, college-preparatory secondary school located in Cary, North Carolina. The school emphasizes the use of technology in the classroom, the arts, and foreign exchange.

History
Cary Academy was founded by Ann and James Goodnight and Ginger and John Sall in 1996, though the first classes were not held until 1997. Goodnight and Sall are co-founders of SAS Institute. The school was founded on the motto “Discovery, Innovation, Collaboration, and Excellence." SAS continues to support the school through a scholarship program.

The school has a 65–acre campus. The school buildings are in the neoclassical style with ornate columns at entrances. It was modeled after the University of Virginia and was designed by Cherry Huffman architects of Raleigh, North Carolina. In 2003, the Sports and Education Annex was completed, allowing more space for both athletics and foreign language classes with a second gym and additional classroom space. Later, a 22,000 STEM center was added to the Sports and Education Annex, including a STEM innovation lab, six wet and dry laboratories, preparation rooms, and common areas for students.

In September 2004, the United States Department of Education named Cary Academy one of 255 public and private schools that had won its No Child Left Behind Blue Ribbon award since the inception of the program.

In July 2011, the original head of the school, Don Berger, announced his stepping down after the 2011–12 school year. He was replaced by Dr. Michael Ehrhardt in July 2013.

In January 2019, the 24,000-square-foot Center for Math and Science was completed, providing a maker space, classrooms, a greenhouse, and laboratories. That same year, the library was also renovated and the track was upgraded.

Demographics 
The demographic breakdown of the 777 students enrolled for the 2021–22 school year was Asian 202 (26.1%), Black 60 (7.8%), Hispanic 31 (4%), Native Hawaiian/Pacific islanders 1 (.1%), White 417 (53.9%), and Multiracial 62 (8%). The school has a minority enrollment of 46.1%. The student gender division is 52% female and 48% male.

In 2022, tuition was $26,995 with 14% of students receiving an average allocation of $18,105 in financial aid.

Rankings 
Niche gives Cary Academy an overall ranking of A+. Niche also ranks the school as #1 in private high schools in North Carolina. The school is the 20th largest private high school in North Carolina.

Academics
Cary Academy includes grades six through twelve. It is accredited by the Southern Association of Colleges and Schools.

Arts
The school's art courses include architecture, ceramics, computer animation, design, drawing/sketching, graphics, painting, photography, sculpture, technical design and production, textiles, and video and film production. In addition, the school's music courses include band, choir/chorus, jazz band, and orchestra. Cary Academy also offers performance arts courses including creative writing, dance, drama, poetry.

Foreign language and exchange 
The school offers four language courses—Chinese-Mandarin, French, German, and Spanish—starting in middle school. In addition, a foreign exchange program that allows 100 upper school students to travel to Argentina, Austria, Chile, China, or France each year. Between 95 to 98% of students participate in this program.

Technology 
From its inception, Cary Academy has placed a heavy emphasis on technology. From 1997 until 2006, Cary Academy featured desktop computers in every classroom, as per the "one-computer-per-student" policy in use at the time. For the 2006–07 school year, these were replaced with tablet PCs issued to every student.

Extracurricular activities

Athletics

Cary Academy is a Division 1 member of the North Carolina Independent Schools Athletic Association (NCISAA). It is also a member of the Capital Area Middle School Conference.

Boys athletic teams include baseball, basketball, cross country, golf, lacrosse, soccer, swimming, tennis, track and field, and wrestling. Girls athletic teams include basketball, cross country, cheerleading, field hockey, golf, lacrosse, soccer, softball, swimming, tennis, track and field, and volleyball.

NCISAA State Championships 

Girls Swim Team, 2017, 2018, 2019, 2020, 2021, 2022
 Boys Swim Team 2015, 2019
 Boys Cross Country 2017
 Varsity Girls Cross Country 2006, 2012, 2017
 Varsity Boys Tennis Team 2008, 2009, 2014, 2015
 Girls Track and Field, 2012

Clubs 
Student clubs include the Art Club, the Chess Club, Community Service, Debate, the Drama Club, Foreign Language and Culture Clubs (Covering Chinese, Spanish, French, and German), Investment Club, Math Club, National Honor Society, the Robotics Club (FRC #5160), SADD, the Science Club, the Step Team, Student Council / Government, and the Technology Club.

Speech and debate 
Cary Academy's Speech and Debate Team participates in competitions of the Tarheel Forensic League. In 2004, the team was state champions, winning the Governor's Cup. The Cary Academy chapter of the National Speech and Debate Association received the Leading Chapter Award for the Tarheel East District in 2007, 2013, and 2015.  The National Speech & Debate Society named Cary Academy #28 on the Top 100 Schools, which includes both public and private schools, for the 2020–21 school year.

Team State Championships 

 2022 Kurt Earnest Speech Sweepstakes
 2011 Randy Shaver Small–Program Sweepstakes
 2004 Governor's Cup (Overall Sweepstakes)

Individual State Championships 

 2022 NC Informative Speaking State Champion: Katherine He 
 2022 NC Declamation State Champion: Isabel Chang
 2022 NC Impromptu Speaking State Champion: JR Cobb
 2021 John Woollen TFL Student of the Year: Ritvik Nalamouthu
 2021  NC Impromptu Speaking State Champion: Sophia Liu
 2021  NC Informative Speaking State Champion: Katherine He 
 2015 Virginia Sutherland Circle of Honor (Hall of Fame): Carole Hamilton
 2014 NC Congressional Debate State Champion: Ted Waechter
 2014 NC Lincoln Douglas Debate State Champion: Laura Cabana
 2008 NC Lincoln Douglas Debate State Champion: ​​​​Arjun Chandran
 2008 NC Public Forum Debate State Champion: Mikie Rooney and Andrew Copeland
 2007 NC Lincoln Douglas Debate State Co-Champions: Kevin Cotter and Robert Thorstad
 2004 NC Lincoln Douglas Debate State Co-Champions: Haley Nix and Keith Pocaro
 2004 NC Extemporaneous Speaking State Champion: Will Harbor
 2003 NC Extemporaneous Speaking State Champion: Ed Winstead

Publications 
Cary Academy has a Literary Magazine, a student newspaper called The Campitor, and a yearbook called The Legacy.

Notable alumni 

 Alex ter Avest, actress
 Charlotte Hook, swimmer
 Travis May, technology company founder and president
 Trey Murphy III, professional basketball player

Notable faculty 

 Mindaugas Timinskas, former varsity basketball head coach and former professional basketball player

References

Buildings and structures in Cary, North Carolina
Private high schools in North Carolina
Private middle schools in North Carolina
Educational institutions established in 1996
Schools in Wake County, North Carolina
Preparatory schools in North Carolina
1996 establishments in North Carolina